Ari Juhani Torniainen (born 15 March 1956 in Lappeenranta) is a Finnish politician currently serving in the Parliament of Finland for the Centre Party at the South-Eastern Finland constituency.

References

1956 births
Living people
People from Lappeenranta
Centre Party (Finland) politicians
Members of the Parliament of Finland (2011–15)
Members of the Parliament of Finland (2015–19)
Members of the Parliament of Finland (2019–23)